Marcos Daniel was the defending champion, however he didn't take part in these championships this year.
Jarkko Nieminen won in the final 6–3, 6–2, against Oleksandr Dolgopolov Jr.

Seeds

Draw

Finals

Top half

Bottom half

External links
 Main Draw
 Qualifying Draw

Morocco Tennis Tour - Marrakech - Singles
Morocco Tennis Tour – Marrakech
2010 Morocco Tennis Tour